Wilhelm Koch-Hooge (11 February 1916 – 2 September 2004) was a German actor. He appeared in more than ninety films from 1953 to 1989.

Filmography

References

External links 

1916 births
2004 deaths
German male film actors
People from Nysa County